Maria Francesca Bentivoglio (born 27 January  1977) is a former Italian tennis player. On 23 August 1993, she reached her highest WTA singles ranking of World No. 73.

She reached the Quarterfinals of the 1993 Italian Open, after beating Manon Bollegraf, Jana Novotná and Natasha Zvereva. The same year she won the 1993 US Open Championships in Juniors.
She was a member of the Italian Fed Cup team. She retired prematurely in 1994 and became a gynaecologist.

ITF finals

Singles (0–2)

References

External links
 
 
 

1977 births
Living people
Italian female tennis players
Grand Slam (tennis) champions in girls' singles
US Open (tennis) junior champions